To Live and Die in L.A. may refer to:

 To Live and Die in L.A. (film), a 1985 crime movie directed by William Friedkin
 To Live and Die in L.A. (soundtrack), the soundtrack to the movie by Wang Chung
 "To Live and Die in L.A." (Wang Chung song), a 1985 single from the soundtrack
 "To Live & Die in L.A." (song), a 1996 single by Makaveli
 To Live and Die in L.A. (novel), a 1984 novel by former Secret Service agent Gerald Petievich; the basis of the movie
 To Live and Die in L.A. (podcast)

de:Leben und Sterben in L.A.
pt:To Live and Die in L.A.
ru:Жить и умереть в Лос-Анджелесе (фильм)